Josiah Given (August 31, 1828 – February 3, 1908) was a justice of the Iowa Supreme Court from March 12, 1889 to December 31, 1901, appointed from Polk County, Iowa. He also served as colonel of the 74th Ohio Infantry Regiment during the American Civil War, receiving a brevet to brigadier general.

Biography
Given was born in Murrysville, Pennsylvania on August 31, 1828 of John and Jane Clendenning Given, who had immigrated from Ireland. In 1838 his family moved to Holmes County, Ohio. In 1847 he enlisted in an Ohio regiment and served in the Mexican–American War. At the end of the war he returned to Ohio to study law in the office of his older brother William, and was admitted to the bar in Stark County, Ohio in 1850. He married Elizabeth Armor in Millersburg, Ohio on October 6, 1851. Starting in 1856 he had a law practice in Coshocton, Ohio.

When the American Civil War started in 1861 he immediately re-enlisted, and during the war served with the 24th Ohio Infantry as a Captain, the 18th Ohio Infantry as a Lieutenant Colonel and the 74th Ohio Infantry as a colonel. He participated in 22 battles over the course of the war.

After the war, he served as Postmaster of the United States House of Representatives during the 39th Congress, sponsored by James A. Garfield, who was then a representative from Ohio.

He moved to Des Moines, Iowa after that to practice law. He served as District Attorney in Polk County and various judicial positions including circuit judge, district judge, and justice of the Iowa Supreme Court.

He died in Des Moines on February 3, 1908 and was buried in Woodland Cemetery.

References

Burials at Woodland Cemetery (Des Moines, Iowa)
Justices of the Iowa Supreme Court
Union Army colonels
People of Ohio in the American Civil War
1828 births
1908 deaths
People from Murrysville, Pennsylvania
People from Holmes County, Ohio
People from Des Moines, Iowa
19th-century American judges
Military personnel from Pennsylvania
Military personnel from Iowa